Colima is an unincorporated community in Gordon County, in the U.S. state of Georgia.

History
A post office called Colima was established in 1886, and remained in operation until being discontinued in 1909. The community was probably named after Colima, in commemoration of the Mexican–American War.

References

Unincorporated communities in Gordon County, Georgia
Unincorporated communities in Georgia (U.S. state)